Eddie Gene Fisher (born July 16, 1936) is an American former Major League Baseball pitcher with the San Francisco Giants, Chicago White Sox, Baltimore Orioles, Cleveland Indians, California Angels and St. Louis Cardinals between 1959 and 1973. He batted and threw right-handed.

Pitching career
Fisher led Pacific Coast League pitchers with 239 innings while playing for the Tacoma Giants in 1960. His minor league record from 1958 to 1961 was 47-28 (.627) with a 3.23 ERA in 93 games (632 innings pitched).

Fisher's best pitch was the knuckleball, and in 1963-1966 he worked out the White Sox bullpen with fellow flutterball specialist Hoyt Wilhelm.

Fisher started just 63 out of the 690 games he appeared in, and completed 7 of those, two for shutouts. He is better-known, however, for his effective relief work.

In Fisher's 15-year career, 1965 stands out as his best season.  He was named to the American League All-Star team and finished 4th in the MVP voting. He pitched the final two innings of the 1965 All-Star Game for the AL, holding the National League scoreless on one hit. He retired Hank Aaron, Roberto Clemente and Ron Santo in order in the top of the ninth.

Fisher led the league that season in WHIP (0.974), games pitched (82), and games finished (60), and was second in earned run average (2.40) and saves (24). His 15-7 record gave him a winning percentage of .682, which ranked fourth. The White Sox finished in second place that year with a record of 95-67.

He was traded to the Baltimore Orioles on June 13, 1966 and helped them win the American League pennant. In 44 appearances for the O's he was 5-3 with 13 saves and a 2.64 ERA in 71.2 innings. Baltimore won the 1966 World Series, but Fisher did not appear in any of the four games against the Los Angeles Dodgers. Jim Palmer, Wally Bunker, and Dave McNally all pitched complete games, and the team needed only one relief appearance, provided by Moe Drabowsky. Fisher spent the 1968 season with the Alvin Dark-managed Cleveland Indians after being acquired along with minor leaguers Johnny Scruggs and Bob Scott from the Orioles for John O'Donoghue and Gordon Lund on November 28, 1967. He later pitched for the California Angels. He was released by the Cardinals on October 26, 1973.

Career totals include a record of 85-70 with 81 saves. In 1538.2 innings pitched he had 812 strikeouts, an ERA of 3.41, and a low 1.193 WHIP. He had a lifetime batting average of just .122 (30-for-246), but did once have three hits in a game, on September 19, 1960 vs. the Chicago Cubs. He currently ranks 92nd on the MLB All-Time Games Pitched List (690) and 72nd on the MLB All-Time Games Finished List (344).

See also
List of knuckleball pitchers

References

External links

Retrosheet
Baseball Library

1936 births
Living people
American League All-Stars
Baltimore Orioles players
Baseball players from Shreveport, Louisiana
California Angels players
Chicago White Sox players
Cleveland Indians players
Corpus Christi Giants players
Knuckleball pitchers
Major League Baseball pitchers
Phoenix Giants players
St. Louis Cardinals players
San Francisco Giants players
Tacoma Giants players